The 2021 AMA Supercross Championship was the 48th season of professional Supercross racing in the United States. The series is sanctioned by the FIM as the world championship of the sport.

Defending champions
The following riders are defending champions having won their respective classes in 2020:
 450 SX – Eli Tomac (Kawasaki)
 250 SX West – N/A  (Dylan  Ferrandis has moved up to the 450 SX class with Yamaha)
 250 SX East – N/A  (Chase Sexton has moved up to the 450 SX class with Honda)

Schedule and results
The 2021 schedule includes 17 races at seven venues, with all NFL stadia and Hampton using three races (two Saturday and one Tuesday).  The two college football stadiums will run on two consecutive Saturdays, while Daytona, which is promoted by NASCAR Holdings and not Feld Entertainment, is the only single event meeting.  One new venue, Hampton, held at Atlanta Motor Speedway, previously hosted the Lucas Oil Motocross, also referred as the "outdoor" season, from 1978 to 1980.

450 SX

Entry list

Championship Standings

250 SX East

Entry list

Championship Standings

250 SX West

Entry list

Championship Standings

References

AMA Supercross Championship
AMA Supercross
AMA Supercross